Namechk is a free web application created by David Goose and Jeremy Woertink. Namechk allows someone to view if a certain username is available. Namechk has over 98 different social network sites as of June 2019.

The service also checks domains.

In July 2022 the fraud-tracking site Hucksters.net exposed David Gosse, the founder and CEO of Namechk, for conducting illegal email spam campaigns on behalf of Namechk using fake web domains such as namechk-mail.com, with help from Robert Lora, an SEO consultant from Florida.

Alternatives
Knowem is an alternative to Namechk and contains over 500 different social network sites.

See also
List of free and open-source web applications

References

American social networking websites
Companies based in Nevada
Domain Name System